William Graham Nicholson, PC, JP (11 March 1862 – 29 July 1942) was a British Liberal Unionist and later Conservative Party politician.

Nicholson was born into a famous family of distillers, the son of William Nicholson and brother of John Sanctuary Nicholson, a notable military figure in Imperial Africa. He grew up in Basing Park at Froxfield, which later became his seat. He was educated at Harrow School and at Trinity College, Cambridge. Nicholson served as Director-General on Mobilisation in the Second Anglo-Boer War from 30 June 1901 and was promoted an Honorary Colonel commanding the 3rd Battalion of the Hampshire Regiment. In 1890 he married Alice Margaret Beach, daughter of Rt Hon. William Wither Bramston Beach MP.

After the death of the Conservative MP William Wickham, he was elected at a by-election in June 1897 as the Liberal Unionist Member of Parliament (MP) for Petersfield in Hampshire, a seat which had previously been held by his father. Nicholson sat as a Conservative after the Liberal Unionists and Conservatives merged in 1912,and held the seat until his retirement at the 1935 general election. He resided under a lease for some time at Bentworth Hall, however, Basing Park was his main residence. He was appointed a Privy Counsellor in 1925. He was an alderman of Hampshire County Council, a Justice of the Peace, and a Deputy Lieutenant of Hampshire.

In his spare time he was a keen horticulturalist.

References

External links 
 

1862 births
1942 deaths
People educated at Harrow School
Alumni of Trinity College, Cambridge
Members of the Privy Council of the United Kingdom
Liberal Unionist Party MPs for English constituencies
Conservative Party (UK) MPs for English constituencies
Royal Hampshire Regiment officers
UK MPs 1895–1900
UK MPs 1900–1906
UK MPs 1906–1910
UK MPs 1910
UK MPs 1910–1918
UK MPs 1918–1922
UK MPs 1922–1923
UK MPs 1923–1924
UK MPs 1924–1929
UK MPs 1929–1931
UK MPs 1931–1935
Deputy Lieutenants of Hampshire
Members of Hampshire County Council
British Army personnel of the Second Boer War
People from Petersfield